The WAMPAS Baby Stars was a promotional campaign sponsored by the United States Western Association of Motion Picture Advertisers, which honored 13 (15 in 1932) young actresses each year whom they believed to be on the threshold of movie stardom. The campaign ran from 1922 to 1934, except for 1930 and 1933.

Most failed to live up to their promotion.  However, a small number of the selections went on to become major movie stars: Clara Bow (1924), Janet Gaynor (1926), Fay Wray (1926), Dolores del Rio (1926), Mary Astor (1926), Joan Crawford (1926), Loretta Young (1929), Jean Arthur (1929), Joan Blondell (1931) and Ginger Rogers (1932). Gaynor, Astor, Crawford, Young and Rogers all were awarded the Academy Award for Best Actress during their careers, with Gaynor receiving the first one during the first year of the award's existence. 

Clara Bow was a Silent era star known as The It Girl. She was Hollywood's greatest female draw at her peak, but her career predated the Academy Awards. Arthur and Blondell had long and fruitful careers in Hollywood, the former as a lead actress, the latter usually in supporting roles after the Pre-Code era.

Others with significant Hollywood careers included Evelyn Brent (1923), Joyce Compton (1926), Lupe Velez (1928), Constance Cummings (1931, who decamped to England), Frances Dee (1931), and Gloria Stuart (1932, whose career revived in the 1990s and she received a nomination as Best Supporting Actress for her role in Titanic).

Overview 

The WAMPAS Baby Stars campaign began in 1922. Every year, publicists chose a group of young actresses who were under contract at major studios that they felt were on the threshold of stardom. Awardees were honored at a party called the "WAMPAS Frolic" and were given extensive media coverage. The awards were not given in 1930 and 1933 due to objections from independent film studios. When the campaign was revived in 1934, freelance actresses, along with studio contract players, were included as the chosen "Baby Stars".

The campaign was discarded in 1935, after which the Western Association of Motion Picture Advertisers disbanded. In 1956, a group of veteran stars, among them 1932 WAMPAS Baby Star Ginger Rogers, chose a group of young actresses supposed to be known as The Wampas Baby Stars. However, since the Western Association of Motion Picture Advertisers no longer existed, the idea fizzled. The selection took place nevertheless, and 15 "babies" were chosen: Phyllis Applegate, Roxanne Arlen, Jolene Brand, Donna Cooke, Barbara Huffman (later known as Barbara Eden), Jewell Lain, Barbara Marx, Lita Milan, Norma Nilsson, Ina Poindexter, Violet Rensin, Dawn Richard, and Delfin Thursday.

The last surviving original WAMPAS Baby Star, Mary Carlisle, died at the age of 104 on August 1, 2018.

List

1922

1923

1924

1925

1926

1927

1928

1929

1931

1932

1934

References

Works cited

External links

 The WAMPAS Baby Stars

 
Baby stars (WAMPAS)
1922 introductions
1922 establishments in the United States
1934 disestablishments in the United States